Bicyclus campina, the Chirinda bush brown, is a butterfly in the family Nymphalidae. It is found in Semuliki National Park, western Uganda, Kenya, Tanzania, the Democratic Republic of the Congo, Zambia, Malawi, Mozambique and Zimbabwe. The habitat consists of dense savanna and open forests.

Adults are on wing year round. There are well-defined seasonal forms.

The larvae feed on Poaceae species.

Subspecies
Bicyclus campina campina (Uganda, Tanzania, Democratic Republic of the Congo, Zambia, Malawi, Mozambique, eastern Zimbabwe)
Bicyclus campina carcassoni Condamin, 1963 (central Kenya)
Bicyclus campina ocelligera (Strand, 1910) (coast of Kenya, the coast and north-eastern of highlands Tanzania)

References

Elymniini
Butterflies described in 1901